Malkiel (also spelled Malchiel) Ashkenazi (Hebrew: מלכיאל אשכנזי) was a Sephardic rabbi and leader of the Jewish community in Hebron in 1540.

The story of his leading a community in Hebron has its root in 1517, when the Ottoman Turks invaded and Sephardic Jews living in Ottoman Salonika were allowed to move to the Holy Land. Many of these Jews had been expelled from Spain in 1492. It was this community that Rabbi Ashkenazi led when he purchased a walled compound in Hebron in 1540  and founded the Avraham Avinu Synagogue which became a center of study for Kabbalah.  He was a respected authority in Jewish law, and his decisions on religious matters were widely accepted, also outside of Hebron. He had an extensive library and helped edit the works of Rabbi Chaim Vital. Rabbi Ashkenazi was buried in the ancient Jewish cemetery in Hebron.

References

Rabbis in Hebron
16th-century rabbis from the Ottoman Empire
Sephardi rabbis in Ottoman Palestine
Year of death unknown
Year of birth unknown